Bunga Citra Lestari (born 22 March 1983), often referred to by her initial BCL, is an Indonesian singer, actress, talent show judge, and television personality.

Career
Bunga Citra Lestari grew up as a multi-talented girl until she started her career as a model for HAI Magazine (Cewek Hai). Following her modelling career, BCL was scouted at a mall and she quickly got her first part in a TV series, “7 Tanda Cinta” (Seven Signs of Love). Before this, BCL was appeared on video clip Jikustik song titled "Seribu Tahun Lamanya" in 1999. Then, she started her career on television as a drama actress. The TV series that she has played were Bukan Perempuan Biasa (which she got a extras role as Child Sri), ABG, Senandung Masa Puber, Kala Cinta Menggoda, Penjaga Hati, and others. She later moved on as a singer and as a film actress.

In 2004, BCL’s singing career began as a featuring singer of PAS Band. She also recorded a single titled "Saat Kau Pergi" (When You Go) for a soundtrack-album for film Dealova in 2005. Her debut album Cinta Pertama ("Sunny", or literally "First Love") was released in 2006 with the hits singles, "Cinta Pertama" and "Aku Tak Mau Sendiri" (I Don't Want To Be Alone). Her first album was success and sold out 75,000 copies in the first week in Indonesia.

Cinta Pertama raised up her name as a famous singer. She also starred her first film with the same title with her album, Cinta Pertama. This film also got then same success with her first studio album. Since then, Bunga decided to focus in music industry and released many hits and collaborated with Indonesia’s most-anticipated musicians including Peter Pan, Ungu, Nidji, Yovie Widianto, Slank, Krisdayanti, Ari Lasso, Andi Rianto and Melly Goeslaw. She also created her Asian-wide recognition with her collaboration with Christian Bautista, as well as Julio Iglesias.

BCL made her feature film debut in Cinta Pertama. Along with the movie, she released her first single as its original soundtrack, Cinta Pertama, a song that changed her life. That ‘first love’ has transformed her into a lovely superstar and she proves her stardom as one of Indonesia’s leading actress. In 2007, Bunga starred her second film titled Kangen ("Miss"). The soundtrack of this film was also taken from Bunga's first album, titled "Mengapa Harus Terjadi" ("Why Must It Be?"). At the end of 2007, she did a duet with Indonesian singer, Ari Lasso in a single titled "Aku dan Dirimu". From her collaboration with Ari Lasso, she won an award from Indonesian Music Awards (AMI) for "Best Pop Collaboration".

She then became very popular in Indonesia and neighbouring countries. Bunga briefly moved to East Timor for career development outside of Indonesia. After gaining popularity in Malaysia, Singapore and the Philippines she returned to Indonesia.

Bunga released her second studio album in 2008 titled Tentang Kamu (About You). The album produced her successful singles, "Tentang Kamu" and "Pernah Muda" (Ever Young). In the same year she also starred in 2 films titled Ada Kamu, Aku Ada and Saus Kacang ("Peanut Sauce") with her husband, Ashraf Sinclair.

In February 2010, Bunga Citra appeared again in "Dahsyat" ("Awesome"), where she sang a duet with Filipino singer Christian Bautista with a remake of Indonesian version of Please Be Careful with My Heart from Christian Bautista's 6th album Romance Revisited originally sung by Filipino Crooner Jose Mari Chan and released in the Philippines.

In 2012, she stars in the biggest box office movie at that time “Habibie & Ainun”, a movie about the great love story of Indonesian former president and his beloved wife. The movie was a big hit with 4.6 million viewers and it has set another milestone for BCL.

In March 2017, she had once again made her mark in the industry by producing a critically acclaimed solo concert “It’s Me BCL Concert” with the highest production cost of all time in Indonesia collaborating with LA-based creative director The Squared Division. Many have praised it and even The Jakarta Post published a review and wrote, “BCL has raised the bar”.

Now as she is one of the biggest stars in Indonesia, she is chosen as one of the judges for Indonesian Idol. The taping starts in October 2017 and will be on air in RCTI from December 2017 until April 2018. She is also chosen as one of the judges for Indonesian Idol Season X in 2019.

Her persona and Indonesian beauty has created her as an iconic figure as she was named the face and brand ambassador of some beauty and prominent consumer goods brands. As she maintains her stylish appearance on and off stage, her fashionable look is acclaimed as one of today’s best-dressed celebrity. 

With all the quality that she possesses, her presence in social media is very good with a high level of engagement from a number of followers; Twitter 5.8 million, Instagram 15.4 million and Line official 9.5 million.

Personal life
Bunga Citra Lestari's name is translated as "flower with an everlasting image". She is also known by the acronym BCL.

Bunga married Ashraf Sinclair, a Malaysian actor, on 8 November 2008, until his death on 18 February 2020. After they got married, Bunga and Ashraf played in the same film, Saus Kacang. She has one child

Discography

Studio albums
 Cinta Pertama (2006)
 Tentang Kamu (2008)
 The Best of BCL (2013)
 Hit Singles BCL and More (2015)
 The Very Best of BCL Wanita Terbahagia (2016)
 It's Me BCL (2017)

Compilation albums
 OST. Dealova (2005)
 The Best of Ari Lasso (2007)

Chart studio song

Filmography

Film

Television

Television show

TV Advertisement

Awards and nominations
List of awards and nominations received by Bunga Citra Lestari

References

External links
 
 Profile

1983 births
Living people
People from Jakarta
English-language singers from Indonesia
21st-century Indonesian women singers
Indonesian child actresses
Indonesian film actresses
Indonesian pop singers
Maya Award winners
Anugerah Musik Indonesia winners
Indonesian television actresses